Jintur Assembly constituency is one of 288 assembly constituencies of the Maharashtra state of India. It comes under Parbhani (Lok Sabha constituency) for the Indian general elections.

This constituency includes Jintur and Sailu tehsils.

The current member of the legislative assembly (MLA) from this constituency is Meghana Bordikar of the Bhartiya Janata Party who defeated Vijay Bhamble of the Nationalist Congress Party by vote margin of 3,717.

Members of Legislative assembly

References

Assembly constituencies of Maharashtra
Parbhani district